TBV may refer to:

 Traditional Balsamic Vinegar
 Tulip breaking virus
 TBV Lemgo, a German handball club from Lemgo
 TBV Wildenheid, a German association football club
 Team Bahrain Victorious, a cycling team from Bahrain 
 Tekken: Blood Vengeance, a 2011 CG film